DXKV (91.1 FM) Voice Radio is a radio station owned and operated by Kaissar Broadcasting Network. The station's studio is located along Rizal Ave., Brgy. Balangasan, Pagadian. DXKV is the 1st station opened by KBNI.

References

Radio stations in Zamboanga del Sur
Radio stations established in 1995
1995 establishments in the Philippines